Chania is one of the four regional units of Crete; it covers the westernmost quarter of the island. Its capital is the city of Chania. Chania borders only one other regional unit: that of Rethymno to the east. The western part of Crete is bounded to the north by the Cretan Sea, and to the west and south by the Mediterranean Sea. The regional unit also includes the southernmost island of Europe, Gavdos.

Geography
Chania regional unit, often informally termed 'Western Crete', is a part of the island which includes the districts of Apokoronas, Sfakia, and Selino in the far South West corner. Other towns in the Chania prefecture include Hora Sfakion, Kissamos, Palaiochora, Maleme, Vryses, Vamos, Georgioupolis and Kalives.

The natural park of Samariá Gorge, a tourist attraction and a refuge for the rare Cretan wild goat or kri-kri, is in the South of the regional unit. The White Mountains or Lefka Ori, through which the Samaria, Aradena, Imbros and other gorges run, are the limestone peaks topped by snow until May that occupy much of Chania regional unit. They contain more than 40 peaks over 2,000 meters high. The highest peak in this area is Pachnes, at 2,453 meters above sea level.

The regional unit also includes three headlands, known as the "three heads" of Crete. From east to west, they are: Akrotiri, Rodopos (also called Spatha) and Gramvousa.

Western Crete is popular with tourists for its spring flowers that linger on into early May in the mountains. Birdwatching is also common, with the lammergeier and golden eagle especially sought for. As an island, Crete has many endemic species of plant and animal.

Crete's only freshwater lake, Lake Kournas, is in the regional unit close to the border with Rethymno regional unit, 47 km from Chania. It is relatively large, with a perimeter of 3.5 km. The lake used to be called 'Korisia' after ancient 'Korion', a city thought to be in the area with a temple to Athena. The lake used to be reportedly full of eels but now is better known for its terrapins and tourists. Tavernas and pedalo rental shops line part of the shore.

Chania is the regional unit of Crete that receives the most precipitation. The Exkursionsflora von Kreta by Jahn & Schoenfelder has a precipitation map and text confirming that in general, western Crete (Chania prefecture) has more precipitation than any other region on an average basis.

Administration
The regional unit Chania is subdivided into seven municipalities. These are (number as in the map in the infobox):

Apokoronas (2)
Chania (1)
Gavdos (3)
Kantanos-Selino (4)
Kissamos (5)
Platanias (6)
Sfakia (7)

Prefecture
The Chania prefecture  was created while Crete was still an autonomous state, and was preserved after the island joined Greece in 1913. As a part of the 2011 Kallikratis government reform, the Chania regional unit was created out of the former prefecture. The prefecture had the same territory as the present regional unit. At the same time, the municipalities were reorganised, according to the table below.

Provinces
The provinces were:
 Apokoronas Province - Vamos
 Kissamos Province - Kissamos
 Kydonia Province - Chania
 Selino Province - Kandanos
 Sfakia Province - Chora Sfakion

Communications
Kydon TV

Notable people
Eleftherios Venizelos (1864–1936), prime minister of Greece
Michael Bletsas, Director of Computing at the MIT Media Lab
Angelos Bletsas, MIT alumnus
Constantinos Daskalakis, Assistant Professor at MIT

See also
List of settlements in the Chania regional unit
Chania (constituency)

References

External links

Municipalities of Chania: Δήμοι Νομού Χανίων
Wildflowers of Western Crete

Maps
Map of Chania region
Wikimapia Chania Region
Explore Chania – Travel Guide – Vacation & Trip Ideas—guide

 
Prefectures of Greece
Regional units of Crete